Alexandre-Hippolyte-Xavier Monnet, C.S.Sp. (4 January 1812 – 1 December 1849) was a French bishop of the Roman Catholic Church, and the Superior General of the Congregation of the Holy Spirit. He served as Vicar Apostolic of Madagascar (now the Archdiocese of Antananarivo) from 1848 until his death.

Life
Alexandre Monnet was born on 4 January 1812 in Mouchin, France. In 1837, at the age of 25, he was ordained a priest in the Congregation of the Holy Spirit. On 2 March 1848, he was appointed Superior General of that Congregation, a post from which he would resign on 3 October 1848. He was appointed Vicar Apostolic of Madagascar, with a titular bishopric (Pella), on 3 October 1848, a post to which he was consecrated on 5 November. He died on 1 December 1849, at the age of 37.

References

1812 births
1849 deaths
19th-century French Roman Catholic priests
19th-century Roman Catholic bishops in Madagascar
Holy Ghost Fathers
Roman Catholic bishops of Antananarivo